Ball is the eighth studio album released by the Athens, GA based band Widespread Panic. It was released on April 15, 2003 and it was the band's first studio album with George McConnell on lead guitar.  McConnell joined the band in 2002 after the death of founding member Michael Houser.

This process of recording the album departed from the band's usual methodology. Widespread Panic's previous studio albums had included mostly songs already familiar to the band's fans. Ball, however, included 12 never-before-heard songs written specifically for the album, along with one song, "Time Waits", previously performed only by singer/guitarist John Bell in solo appearances. It was also the first Widespread Panic album which did not feature at least one cover song.

The album reached a peak position of #61 on the Billboard 200 chart.

Track listing
All songs by Widespread Panic unless otherwise noted.

Personnel 
Widespread Panic
John Bell – guitar, vocals
John Hermann –	keyboards, vocals
Todd Nance – drums, Vocals
Domingo S. Ortiz – percussion
Dave Schools –	bass, vocals
George McConnell – guitar, vocals

Production
John Keane – production, mixing, recording
Billy Field – assistant
Danny Michael Hilley – engineer
Ted Jansen – mastering

External links
Widespread Panic website
Everyday Companion
[ All Music entry]

2003 albums
Widespread Panic albums
Albums produced by John Keane (record producer)